is a Japanese football player. She plays for NTV Tokyo Verdy Beleza In the Japanese WE League. and Japan national team.

Club career
Yamashita was born in Adachi, Tokyo on September 29, 1995. After graduating from high school, she joined Nippon TV Beleza in 2014. The club won L.League championship and she was selected Best Eleven for 3 years in a row from 2015 season.

National team career
In August 2015, when Yamashita was 19 years old, she was selected Japan national team for 2015 East Asian Cup. At this competition, on August 4, she debuted against South Korea. In 2018, she played at 2018 Asian Cup and Japan won the championship. She played 25 games for Japan.

National team statistics

References

External links

Japan Football Association

1995 births
Living people
Association football people from Tokyo
Japanese women's footballers
Japan women's international footballers
Nadeshiko League players
Nippon TV Tokyo Verdy Beleza players
Women's association football goalkeepers
Footballers at the 2018 Asian Games
Asian Games gold medalists for Japan
Asian Games medalists in football
Medalists at the 2018 Asian Games
2019 FIFA Women's World Cup players
Footballers at the 2020 Summer Olympics
Olympic footballers of Japan